The Throne is a 2015 South Korean historical drama film directed by Lee Joon-ik, starring Song Kang-ho and Yoo Ah-in. Set during the reign of King Yeongjo, the film is about the life of Crown Prince Sado, the heir to the throne who was deemed unfit to rule and, at age 27, was condemned to death by his own father by being locked in a rice chest for eight days.

The Throne won three awards at the 35th Korean Association of Film Critics Awards, including Best Film. It was also selected as the South Korean entry for the Best Foreign Language Film at the 88th Academy Awards, but it was not nominated.

Plot
The film opens with the crown prince, Sado, carrying out a plot to kill his father, the king.  However, the assassination - for untold reasons - does not take place.

The next day, Sado's mother goes to the king to encourage him not to punish Sado's son when he punishes Sado.  The king summons Sado and tells him to kill himself.  Fearing for their own lives, Sado's supporters rush in and save him from suicide.  Instead the king orders Sado into a large rice box, which he then nails shut since no one else will do it for him.

The movie proceeds to flip back and forth chronologically between the rice box in the courtyard and the history of how it got there.

The king is presented as a doting father very concerned with the educational attainments of his young son.  Sado is presented as winsome and diplomatic even at a very early age.  However, he does not take well to the rote memorization he is expected to perform.  He fails to properly acquire a passage written by his father, and we find him preferring to socialize and paint.  When asked how often he likes to study, all are shocked with his very frank answer of "once or twice a year."  The king perceives his son is being rebellious.

Meanwhile, three days in the box Sado begins to hallucinate.  He imagines he is covered by centipedes and breaks out of the box, washing himself in the pond.  He is returned to the box, which is then fortified.

In another flashback, the king describes familial relations among royalty being different from commoners.  "In the palace, parents think of their children as enemies."  Sado's father goes on to tell how his father had his wife poisoned, and he himself has been accused of killing his own brother to secure the throne.  Here and at other places during the movie he claims he does not want to be the king.

The king proposes his son be made a substitute king, a method by which the crown prince may exercise the office of king under the ongoing tutelage of the elderly king.  In his new role, Sado is assertive and just, but some factions that have enjoyed special privilege under the corrupt elder king take issue with his rulings.  The elder king jumps to the conclusion that his son is capitalizing on schisms within the kingdom to weaken the elder king's powers.  He directs his son to make fewer decisions and allow the nobles to lead.  However, when his son defers to them, the king is alarmed at the decisions of his nobles and countermands Sado's rulings.  Then Sado begins to consult his father to make wiser decisions, but the old man ridicules his son for being unable to govern independently.  Nothing Sado does is pleasing to the king, who proceeds to humiliate his son.  However, the Royal Queen Dowager is overjoyed at Sado's wisdom and acts as his protector.

When the king refuses to call for celebrations for the queen's 60th birthday, the tension comes to a head.  He storms into her chambers and insists that she support him or approve his stepping down.  Much to his shock, she approves, thereby making Sado king.

Curiously, Sado refuses to ascend the throne.  After the elderly king's departure, Sado remains kneeling in the courtyard where his subjects fear he will die of exposure.  The queen is forced to revoke her approval, and in humiliation, she stops eating, bringing her life to an end.  At her funeral, the elder king blames Sado for her death.  Sado snaps.

Sado becomes a religious zealot and an alcoholic.  He digs an underground grave complex for himself and refuses to pay his respects to the new queen.  In a rage, he kills one of the palace eunuchs.  He throws a celebration for his mother for her 60th birthday at which his actions imply madness.  Meanwhile, the elder king takes on Sado's son as his new protege, but has his own son framed for plotting a conspiracy against the crown.

The scene from the beginning is replayed with a few additions, the important one being why he did not kill his father.  At the critical moment, he found his son with his grandfather and overheard his son tell his grandfather that Sado had a good heart.  Sado did not go through with the assassination.

Sado dies on the seventh day of his imprisonment and is buried on the eighth, but his father has all memory of him erased.  He directs his grandson never to even speak his name.  However, after the death of the elder king, Sado's son goes out of his way to honour his father, thereby vindicating Sado.

Cast
 Song Kang-ho as King Yeongjo
 Yoo Ah-in as Crown Prince Sado
 Moon Geun-young as Lady Hyegyeong
 Shin Soo-yeon as young Lady Hyegyeong 
 Jeon Hye-jin as Consort Yeong
 Kim Hae-sook as Queen Inwon
 Park Won-sang as Hong Bong-han
 Lee Dae-yeon as Kim Sang-ro
 Kang Seong-hae as Kim Han-gu
 Choi Deok-moon as Hong In-han
 Jung Suk-yong as Eunuch Hong
 Choi Min-cheol as Chae Je-gong
 Jin Ji-hee as Princess Hwawan
 Park Myeong-shin as Queen Jeongseong
 Seo Yea-ji as Queen Jeongsun
 Park So-dam as Lady Moon
 Son Deok-gi as Hong Nak-in
 Cha Soon-bae as Park Nae-gwan
 So Ji-sub as King Jeongjo (cameo)

Production
Filming began on 8 July 2014. The Throne was Moon Geun-young's first film in 8 years.

Reception

Box office
The Throne opened in South Korea on 16 September 2015. By October 25, it has grossed  from 6.23 million admissions.

Awards and nominations

See also
 List of submissions to the 88th Academy Awards for Best Foreign Language Film
 List of South Korean submissions for the Academy Award for Best Foreign Language Film

References

External links
  
 
 
 

2015 films
South Korean historical drama films
2010s historical drama films
Films set in the Joseon dynasty
2010s Korean-language films
Films directed by Lee Joon-ik
2010s South Korean films